The Masked Dancer is a German reality competition television series that premiered on ProSieben on 6 January 2022, based on the American television series of the same name. Like The Masked Singer'''s format, celebrity contestants wear head-to-toe costumes and face masks that conceal their identities. Matthias Opdenhövel hosts the show, with Alexander Klaws and Steven Gätjen serving as panelists.

The winner of the first season was Oli.P as "Affe".

Production
In June 2021, EndemolShine Germany announced a dancing spinoff series that shares the same name of the American version, following the success of its sister show The Masked Singer. In November 2021, it was announced that ProSieben will broadcast the show, the same channel who produced The Masked Singer.

Format
In four live episode, seven celebrities such as singers, actors or athletes in full-body costumes compete against each other with a choreography. Before the respective performance, a short video is shown, in which hidden clues to the identity of the costumed dancers are contained. Unlike The Masked Singer, there will be more evidence in The Masked Dancer.

The viewers voting took place exclusively via the ProSieben-app, after each Duel or Truel. The winners may keep the mask on and participate in the next episode. With repeated or without repeated singing, the losers have to wait for the final vote of the respective show. The singer with the fewest votes has to take off his mask and leave the show. The others continue to participate.

After each appearance, the two panelist members - three during the first season - and a guest member of the advice team who changes from episode to episode express their guess as to who is under the mask. The panelist team also asks a question to almost every singer, who only answers vaguely or evasively. Before making any decision, the panelist team makes an assumption after the voting has ended, for whom it will be tight or who will be eliminated. Before unmasking, the celebrities are once more asked to give their final guess about who is beneath the mask.

The opening theme is "Who Are You" by The Who. After a decision, a section of the song "Baby" by Bakermat.

Filming
Production films in Cologne at MMC Studios where The Masked Singer has also filmed.

Panelists and host

Like in the original version, Matthias Opdenhövel will host the show. On 2 January 2022, it was announced that the panel would consist of singer Alexander Klaws and presenter and actor Steven Gätjen.

Guest panelists

Like in The Masked Singer, various guest panelists appeared as the third judge in the judging panel for one episode. These guest panelists included:

Contestants
The show included 7 contestants. On 23 December 2021 the first three costumes were announced. On 4 January 2022 two more costumes were announced. The last two costumes were announced in the first live show.

Episodes
Week 1 (6 January)

Week 2 (13 January)

Week 3 (20 January) - Semi-final

Week 4 (27 January) – Final
 Group number: "Gonna Make You Sweat (Everybody Dance Now)" by C+C Music Factory feat. Martha Wash and Freedom Williams

Round One

Round Two

Reception
Ratings

Spin-offs and related shows
The Masked Dancer - red. Special
Like in the original show, a companion show with the name The Masked Dancer - red. Special'' was shown on ProSieben immediately after the main show. The show features interviews with the panelists and the unmasked celebrity from that episode. Viviane Geppert (episodes 1-3) and Annemarie Carpendale (episode 4) were the presenters of the show.

References

External links 
 Official website
 The Masked Dancer on fernsehserien.de
 The Masked Dancer Germany on IMDb

2022 German television series debuts
2022 German television seasons
German reality television series
ProSieben original programming
German-language television shows
German television series based on American television series
Masked Dancer